Willis Alvés Furtado (born 4 September 1997) is a professional footballer who plays as a winger for Jerv. Born in France, he represents the Cape Verde national team.

Club career
Furtado spent his early career in  France and Scotland before moving to FC Masr in Egypt. He made his debut with Masr in a 3–0 Egyptian Premier League win over El Entag El Harby on 22 September 2020.

International career
Furtado was born in France and is of Cape Verdean descent. He was called up to the represent the Cape Verde for a set of friendlies in October 2020. He debuted for Cape Verde in a 2–1 friendly win over Andorra on 7 October 2020.

References

External links
 
 

1997 births
Living people
People from Ivry-sur-Seine
French sportspeople of Cape Verdean descent
Cape Verdean footballers
French footballers
Association football wingers
Cape Verde international footballers
2021 Africa Cup of Nations players
Championnat National 3 players
Scottish Professional Football League players
Egyptian Premier League players
Norwegian First Division players
Stenhousemuir F.C. players
Airdrieonians F.C. players
Raith Rovers F.C. players
FC Masr players
FK Jerv players
Cape Verdean expatriate footballers
French expatriate footballers
Cape Verdean expatriate sportspeople in Scotland
Cape Verdean expatriate sportspeople in Egypt
Cape Verdean expatriate sportspeople in Norway
French expatriate sportspeople in Scotland
French expatriate sportspeople in Egypt
French expatriate sportspeople in Norway
Expatriate footballers in Scotland
Expatriate footballers in Egypt
Expatriate footballers in Norway